Marcy Dam was a wooden dam on the Marcy Brook in the Adirondack High Peaks in North Elba, New York, United States; it impounded Marcy Dam Pond.  An early version of the dam was constructed by the Conservation Corps during the 1930s. It was rebuilt most recently during the early 1970s.

The area around where the dam stood is a popular camping spot for hikers in the high peaks. The New York State Department of Environmental Conservation maintains an Interior Outpost on the western shore.

During Hurricane Irene, the dam was damaged due to flooding and the pond was partially drained. The trail that went over the dam has been rerouted downstream.

In January 2014, the New York State Department of Environmental Conservation announced that Marcy Dam would be removed. NYSDEC explained that the "dam no longer holds back water during low flow periods and has an inadequate spillway." The department added that contemporary standards for this structure would make reconstruction expensive. Finally, NYSDEC noted that "the principles of wilderness management include allowing rivers and streams to flow unfettered and to minimize human-made structures."

References

Dams in New York (state)
Adirondacks
Buildings and structures in Essex County, New York
Buildings and structures completed in the 1930s
Dams completed in the 1930s
1930s establishments in New York (state)
Wooden buildings and structures in the United States